Mužla is a village and large municipality in the Nové Zámky District in the Nitra Region of south-west Slovakia.

Geography
The municipality lies at an altitude of 121 metres and covers an area of 52.097 km².

History
In historical records the village was first mentioned in 1156.
After the Austro-Hungarian army disintegrated in November 1918, Czechoslovak troops occupied the area, later acknowledged internationally by the Treaty of Trianon. Between 1938 and 1945 Mužla once more  became part of Miklós Horthy's Hungary through the First Vienna Award. From 1945 until the Velvet Divorce, it was part of Czechoslovakia. Since then it has been part of Slovakia.

Population
It has a population of about 1980 people. The population is about 85% Hungarian and 15% Slovak.

Facilities
The village has a small public library.

Twin towns — Sister cities
Mužla is twinned with:
  Nyergesújfalu, Hungary
  Mužlja, Serbia

References

External links
 Detailed map
 Mužla – Nové Zámky Okolie

Villages and municipalities in Nové Zámky District